Micropoltys is a genus of South Pacific orb-weaver spiders first described by Władysław Kulczyński in 1911.

Species
 it contains four species:
Micropoltys baitetensis Smith & Levi, 2010 – New Guinea
Micropoltys debakkeri Smith & Levi, 2010 – New Guinea, Australia (Queensland)
Micropoltys heatherae Smith & Levi, 2010 – Australia (Queensland)
Micropoltys placenta Kulczyński, 1911 – New Guinea

References

Araneidae
Araneomorphae genera
Spiders of Asia
Spiders of Australia